Akşehir is a town and district of Konya Province in the Central Anatolia region of Turkey. According to 2000 census, population of the district is 114,918 of which 63,000 live in the town of Akşehir.

The town is situated at the edge of a fertile plain, on the north side of the Sultan Dagh.

Climate

History
Philomelion was probably a Pergamene foundation on the great Graeco-Roman Highway from Ephesus to the east, and to its townsmen the Smyrniotes wrote the letter that describes the martyrdom of Polycarp. Cicero, on his way to Cilicia, dated some of his extant correspondence there; and the place played a considerable part in the frontier wars between the Byzantine emperors and the Sultanate of Rum.

It became an important Seljuk town, and late in the 14th century passed into Ottoman hands. There Sultan Bayezid I is said by Ali of Yezd to have died after his defeat at the Battle of Ankara at the hands of Emir Timur.

Modern times
The town's landmarks include the alleged tomb of Nasreddin Hoca, the tomb of Seydi Mahmut, the house used as headquarters by the Turkish Army during the last phase of the Greco-Turkish War (1919–1922), other monuments and old Turkish houses.

Between 5 July and 10 July each year, commemorations with concerts and other social activities are held to the memory of Akşehir's famous resident, Nasreddin Hodja.

With its rich architectural heritage, Akşehir is a member of the Norwich-based European Association of Historic Towns and Regions.

Name
The Turkish name  literally means "white city". It is a compound of two words, namely ak, "white", a Turkic word; and şehir, "town", which is from Persian  shahr, "town".

In English usage other spellings of the name include Ak-Shehr, Ak-Shahr, Akshehr, Akshahr, Akshehir, and Aqshahr.

See also
 Doğrugöz

Notes

References
 
 https://web.archive.org/web/20110831133530/http://tuikrapor.tuik.gov.tr/reports/rwservlet?adnks=&report=turkiye_ilce_koy_sehir.RDF&p_il1=42&p_ilce1=532&p_kod=2&desformat=html&ENVID=adnksEnv
Attribution

External links

 District governor's official website 
 District municipality's official website 

Cities in Turkey
Populated places in Konya Province
Districts of Konya Province